The 1956 New Zealand rugby league tour of Australia was the eighteenth tour by New Zealand's national rugby league team, and the thirteenth tour to visit Australia. The fifteen-match tour included three Test Matches. 
The touring team began with a pair of wins but then lost the next two, against Newcastle and the First Test in Sydney. Five strong performances in Queensland followed, with wins by wide margins in high-scoring matches. In contrast, the Second Test was a low-scoring match, Australia winning 8 to 2 to secure their first Trans-Tasman series win since 1935. New Zealand lost the Third Test, and thus the series three-nil, and also the two tour matches that followed.

Leadership
The team was captained by Tommy Baxter. 

The touring team was managed by Ron McGregor.

Squad 
The Rugby League News published a Team Photo, Player Details (Occupation, Age, Height and Weight) and pen portraits of the tourists: Backs and Forwards which listed their provincial team.

Matches

1st Test

2nd Test

3rd Test

Sources

References

New Zealand national rugby league team tours
Rugby league tour
New Zealand rugby league tour
Rugby league tours of Australia